Change is the first solo studio album by Ray Wilson, after his live album the previous year. He started to gain success after a series of sold-out gigs during the 2001 Edinburgh Festival. The album achieved a new form of success and he did a series of tour dates throughout Europe.

Track listing (Regular edition) 
 "Intro" (Ray Wilson)
 "Goodbye Baby Blue" (R. Wilson)
 "Change" (R. Wilson)
 "Along the Way" (Steve Wilson)
 "Yesterday" (R. Wilson)
 "Beach" (R. Wilson)
 "Cry If You Want To" (R. Wilson)
 "Beautiful Child" (R. Wilson)
 "She Fades Away" (S. Wilson)
 "I Look for You There" (S. Wilson)
 "Believe" (R. Wilson)
 "Another Day" (R. Wilson)
 "The Last Horizon" (R. Wilson)

Track listing (Special edition extra tracks) 
 "Gouranga" (R. Wilson)
 "Dark" (S. Wilson)
 "Cool Waters" (R. Wilson)

Track listing (2CD Tour edition) 
 "No Son of Mine" (Tony Banks, Phil Collins, Mike Rutherford)
 "Change" (R. Wilson)
 "Follow You Follow Me" (Banks, Collins, Rutherford)
 "Along the Way" (R. Wilson)
 "Ripples" (Banks, Rutherford)
 "Believe" (R. Wilson)
 "One" (R. Wilson)
 "Beach" (R. Wilson)
 "I Know What I Like" (Banks, Collins, Peter Gabriel, Steve Hackett, Rutherford)
 "Fading Lights" (Banks, Collins, Rutherford)

Singles 
"Change" (March 2003)
"Change" (Radio Edit)
"Change" (Album Version)
"Change" (Radio Remix)
"Gouranga" (Single Bonus Track)
"Not About Us" (taken from Live & Acoustic)
"Goodbye Baby Blue" (September 2003)
"Goodbye Baby Blue" (Single Edit)
"Goodbye Baby Blue" (Album Version)
"Change" (Live Acoustic Version)
"Ripples" (Live Acoustic Version)
"Believe" (Live Acoustic Version)

References

2003 debut albums
Ray Wilson (musician) albums
Inside Out Music albums